The Singapore national under-21 football team is an under-21 football team representing Singapore.

Background

Fandi Ahmad was unveiled as the FAS’ new head coach, youth, during a press conference at Jalan Besar Stadium on 4/10/2016 and will take charge of the youth teams headed for the 2018 Asian Games, the 2019 and 2021 SEA Games, as well as the 2020 Olympics.

He will focus on players who are within the 19 to 23 age bracket and report to FAS technical director Michel Sablon.  It was reported that he has an option to extend his contract for another three years in 2019, provided both parties are happy with the progress that has been made by then.

Fixtures and Results

2018

2022

Players
The following players were called up for the friendly match against Albirex Niigata (S) on 24 September 2022.

Recent call-ups
The following players have also been called up in the last 36 months to the Singapore squad.

References

U21
Asian national under-21 association football teams